Wassim Chouaib Aouachria (born 12 May 2000) is a professional footballer who plays as a forward for Irish club Waterford.

A youth product of Marseille, Aouachria moved to English club Charlton Athletic in 2019, making his senior debut in 2020. Aouachria was born in France to Algerian parents, and holds dual-citizenship; he represented Algeria internationally at youth level at the 2018 Mediterranean Games.

Club career

Youth career 
Aouachria was born on 12 March 2000 in Roubaix, France, to parents from Annaba, Algeria. He began playing youth football at local club Aubagne in 2006, aged six, before joining Marseille's under-14 team in 2013.

Charlton Athletic
On 16 January 2019, Aouachria joined Charlton Athletic's Under-23 squad on a short-term contract from Marseille. The player stated that "the reason for leaving Marseille was due to his lack of promotion to the reserve team and his unwillingness to continue with the under-19 team".

On 2 May 2019, his contract was extended until June 2021. During a training session with the first team, Aoucharia suffered an ACL injury; he had scored five goals in nine starts for the U23 team prior to his injury. He remained on the sidelines for over one year.

Aouachria made his professional debut for the senior team on 10 November 2020, scoring in a 3–1 win against Leyton Orient in the EFL Trophy.

On 23 May 2022, it was announced that Aouachria was leaving Charlton Athletic at the end of his contract.

Loans to the National League
On 31 August 2021, Aouachria joined Aldershot Town on an initial three-month loan. 

On 11 December 2021, Aouachria joined National League South side Braintree Town on loan until 3 January 2022.

On 18 March 2022, Aouachria joined Hampton & Richmond Borough on a month's loan. Aouachria scored his first goal for Hampton & Richmond Borough in a 2–0 victory over Billericay Town on 9 April 2022.

Waterford
On 4 July 2022, Aouachria joined Waterford of the League of Ireland First Division, the Republic of Ireland's second tier. He scored his first goals on 31 July, helping his team beat St Patrick's Athletic 3–2 with a brace in the FAI Cup.

International career 
Born in France, Aouachria has represented Algeria internationally at under-18 level at the 2018 Mediterranean Games: he played against France, Bosnia and Herzegovina, and Spain. In an interview in 2020, Aouachria stated his preference to represent Algeria internationally over France.

Style of play 
Aouachria is a versatile forward capable of playing as a number 10 or a winger. His main attributes are his technical ability and finishing.

Personal life 
Aouachria described Zinedine Zidane's performances at the 2006 FIFA World Cup as the "trigger" for him to start playing football. The player that he prefers to watch is Nabil Fekir, whereas his favourite Algerian national is Riyad Mahrez.

Career statistics

References

External links

 
 

2000 births
Living people
Sportspeople from Roubaix
Footballers from Hauts-de-France
French sportspeople of Algerian descent
Algerian footballers
French footballers
Association football forwards
Aubagne FC players
Olympique de Marseille players
Charlton Athletic F.C. players
Aldershot Town F.C. players
Braintree Town F.C. players
Hampton & Richmond Borough F.C. players
Waterford F.C. players
English Football League players
National League (English football) players
League of Ireland players
Algeria youth international footballers
Mediterranean Games competitors for Algeria
Competitors at the 2018 Mediterranean Games
Algerian expatriate footballers
Algerian expatriate sportspeople in England
Algerian expatriate sportspeople in Ireland
French expatriate footballers
French expatriate sportspeople in England
French expatriate sportspeople in Ireland
Expatriate footballers in England
Expatriate association footballers in Ireland